Angelina is a 1947 film directed by Luigi Zampa.  The star of the film is Anna Magnani, who won Volpi Cup prize for "Best Actress" at the Venice Film Festival. Zampa was nominated for a Golden Lion. The film is in the public domain.

Cast
 Anna Magnani - Angelina Bianchi
 Nando Bruno - Pasquale Bianchi
 Ave Ninchi - Carmela
 Ernesto Almirante - Luigi
 Agnese Dubbini - Cesira
 Armando Migliari - Callisto Garrone
 Maria Donati - La signora Garrone
 Maria Grazia Francia - Annetta Bianchi
 Vittorio Mottini - Roberto
 Franco Zeffirelli - Filippo Garrone
 Gianni Musi - Libero Bianchi (as Gianni Glori)
 Ughetto Bertucci - Il droghiere (as Ugo Bertucci)
 Anita Angius - Adriana Bianchi

References

External links
 

1947 films
1947 drama films
Italian black-and-white films
1940s Italian-language films
Films set in Rome
Films shot in Rome
Films directed by Luigi Zampa
Films with screenplays by Suso Cecchi d'Amico
Italian drama films
1940s Italian films